The 2008 Puerto Rico Republican presidential caucuses were held on February 24, 2008.  John McCain won all 20 pledged (and the support of three unpledged delegates) at the Commonwealth's convention.

Results

See also

 Puerto Rico Democratic primary, 2008
 Republican Party (United States) presidential primaries, 2008

References

Republican caucuses
Puerto Rico
2008